Lučarjev Kal is a settlement in the hills east of Muljava in the Municipality of Ivančna Gorica in central Slovenia. The area is part of the historical region of Lower Carniola. The municipality is now included in the Central Slovenia Statistical Region. 

A small roadside chapel-shrine in the centre of the village is dedicated to Our Lady of Lourdes and was built in the early 20th century.

References

External links
Lučarjev Kal on Geopedia

Populated places in the Municipality of Ivančna Gorica